Maggie Elizabeth Jones is an American  actress, best known for her roles in We Bought a Zoo, the Fox sitcom Ben and Kate, and as Lea Clark in An American Girl: Lea to the Rescue.

Personal life 
Jones attended Landmark Christian School, a private school in Fairburn, Georgia, and graduated in May 2022. She ran for the varsity cross country team during her time there.

Filmography

References

External links

Living people
American child actresses
American film actresses
American television actresses
21st-century American actresses
Year of birth missing (living people)